Blackburn's Station was a stage stand on the old Butterfield Overland Mail route in Indian Territory. It was located in what is now Pittsburg County, Oklahoma. The station was named for Casper B. Blackburn, an inter-married Choctaw and trader.

Blackburn's Station was added to the National Register of Historic Places (#73001568) in 1973.

Sources
Shirk, George H. Oklahoma Place Names. Norman: University of Oklahoma Press, 1987:  .
Wright, Murial H.; George H. Shirk; Kenny A. Franks. Mark of Heritage. Oklahoma City: Oklahoma Historical Society, 1976.
Wright, Muriel H. "The Butterfield Overland Mail One Hundred Years Ago", Chronicles of Oklahoma 35:1 (January 1957) 55-71 (accessed August 21, 2006).

References

Stagecoach stations on the National Register of Historic Places in Oklahoma
Transport infrastructure completed in 1861
Buildings and structures in Pittsburg County, Oklahoma
Butterfield Overland Mail in Indian Territory
1861 establishments in Indian Territory
National Register of Historic Places in Pittsburg County, Oklahoma
Stagecoach stations in Oklahoma